Mitchell Heard (born March 12, 1992) is a Canadian professional ice hockey center who is currently playing under contract with the Belleville Senators of the American Hockey League (AHL). Heard was drafted 41st overall in the 2012 NHL Entry Draft by the Colorado Avalanche.

Playing career
Heard first played at the Junior A level for the Bowmanville Eagles in the Central Canadian Hockey League registering 30 points in 22 games and leading the Eagles in the post-season with 19 points in 22 games before joining the Plymouth Whalers midway into the 2009–10 season.

In his rookie campaign with the Whalers, Heard immediately established himself within the offensive lines in finishing fourth on the club with 48 points in 66 games. He increased his scoring to a point-per-game rate the following season to be selected with the Colorado Avalanche's first selection in the 2012 NHL Entry Draft, 41st overall.

With a physically mature frame, Heard was later signed in the off-season on August 14, 2012, to a three-year entry-level contract with the Colorado Avalanche. In the 2012–13 pre-season, Heard participated in his first Avalanche training camp and was assigned to AHL affiliate, the Lake Erie Monsters. Heard made his professional debut with the Monsters and used sparingly as a depth forward before he was later reassigned to his junior club, the Plymouth Whalers, mid-season on January 1, 2013. In his return to the Whalers, Heard was leaned on offensively to finish with 36 points in 32 regular season games but was unable to advance the Whalers to the Conference finals.

In his first full professional season in 2013–14, Heard was in the familiar position of starting the year with the Monsters. Used primarily an checking-line agitator with the ability to fight, Heard finished fourth amongst the AHL in penalty minutes with 167 in 63 games.

Struggling to find his offensive game in the AHL, and in the last year of his entry-level deal with the Avalanche, Heard was reassigned to the Fort Wayne Komets during the 2014–15 season. He responded immediately to contribute with 10 goals and 16 points in just 12 games to earn the ECHL player of the week award in November. He was returned to the Monsters for the remainder of the regular season to post consecutive 100 plus penalty minute seasons. With the Monsters out of playoff contention, Heard was reassigned to the Komets Kelly Cup run. He contributed with 9 points in 10 games before falling to the Toledo Walleye in the Conference semi-finals.

In the offseason, Heard was not tendered a qualifying offer by the Avalanche to be released to free agency. On July 15, 2015, Heard was signed to a one-year AHL contract with the Stockton Heat. After attending the Heat's training camp, Heard was reassigned to begin the 2015–16 season, with ECHL affiliate, the Adirondack Thunder. Over the course of the year, Heard split his time between the Thunder and Heat, appearing in 22 games for 7 points in the AHL.

As a free agent in the off-season, Heard continued his career in the AHL, securing a one-year deal with the Charlotte Checkers on August 11, 2016. Heard would play two seasons within the Checkers organization, also playing on assignment with the Florida Everblades in the ECHL, leading the club in scoring to help reach the Kelly Cup finals against the Colorado Eagles in the 2017–18 season.

Heard opted for a move abroad following his fifth professional season, securing a one-year contract with German club, the Straubing Tigers of the Deutsche Eishockey Liga (DEL), on July 12, 2018.

Heard played and produced offensively with the Straubing Tigers through three seasons, before opting to terminate his contract mid-way through the 2020–21 season, and return to Canada for personal reasons on March 23, 2021.

Career statistics

References

External links
 

1992 births
Living people
Adirondack Thunder players
Belleville Senators players
SC Bietigheim-Bissingen players
Canadian ice hockey centres
Charlotte Checkers (2010–) players
Colorado Avalanche draft picks
Florida Everblades players
Fort Wayne Komets players
Lake Erie Monsters players
Plymouth Whalers players
Stockton Heat players
Straubing Tigers players
Toledo Walleye players